Albert Bullock (1884–1951) was an English footballer who played for Stoke.

Career
Bullock was born in Stoke-upon-Trent and played amateur football with Bucknall before joining Stoke in 1908. He played in three matches in the 1908–09 season scoring once against Shrewsbury Town. He managed just one appearance in the following season before joining Stafford Rangers.

Career statistics

References

English footballers
Stoke City F.C. players
1884 births
1951 deaths
Stafford Rangers F.C. players
Association football forwards